The 2005 Porsche Carrera Cup Great Britain was the third season of the one-make championship. It consisted of 20 rounds, beginning on 9 April at Donington Park and finishing on 2 October at Brands Hatch. The series supported the British Touring Car Championship throughout the season. Damien Faulkner claimed his first title, ahead of Richard Westbrook who had won the championship the previous year.

Entry List
 All drivers raced in Porsche 911 GT3s.

Calendar & Winners

Championship Standings
Points were awarded on a 20, 18, 16, 14, 12, 10, 9, 8, 7, 6, 5, 4, 3, 2, 1 basis to the top 15 finishers in each race, with 1 point for the fastest lap in each race and 1 point for pole position in the first race of each meeting.

External links
 Porsche Carrera Cup Great Britain

Porsche Carrera Cup GB
Porsche Carrera Cup Great Britain seasons